The Government of the Czech Republic exercises executive power in the Czech Republic. The members of the government are the Prime Minister of the Czech Republic (Chairman of the Government), the deputy prime minister and other ministers. It has its legal basis in the Constitution of the Czech Republic.

Overview
The government is led by the Prime Minister, who selects all the remaining ministers at hand. The Government of the Czech Republic is responsible to the Chamber of Deputies from the Czech Republic.

The Prime Minister is appointed by the President of the Czech Republic. The current Prime Minister is Petr Fiala.

Current Cabinet

The current government, sworn in on December 17, 2021 is the 16th since the dissolution of Czechoslovakia in 1993. It has # members and a prime minister. 
The cabinet consists of the following members:

Advisory and Working Bodies of the Government

Councils 
 National Security Council
 Government Legislative Council
 Inter-ministerial Commission for Roma Community Affairs
 Government Council for Human Rights
 Government Council for National Minorities
 Research and Development Council
 Government Council for Drug Policy Coordination
 Government Dislocation Commission
 Government Board for People with Disabilities
 Government Commissioner for Human Rights
 The Government Council for Equal Opportunities for Women and Men
 Committee for EU
 Independent Panel on the Assessment of the Czech Republic's Long-Term Energy Requirements

Bodies not provided for by the Government Office
 Government Council for Sustainable Development
 The Czech Government Council for Health Care and Environment
 The Government Council for Safety, Hygiene and Health at Work
 Government Council for Seniors and Population Ageing
 Czech Republic Government Council for Road Safety
 National Co-ordination Group for Digital Broadcasting in the CR
 The Czech Commission for UNESCO
 The Central Flood Commission
 The Czech Republics' Council for Quality (in Czech only)
 Government Council for the Revitalization of Areas Affected by Flooding
 Commission on the Management of Occurrences of Infectious Diseases in the Czech Republic
 Government Council for the Information Society
 Commission for the Reconciliation of Relations between the State and Churches and Religious Societies
 Czech Republic Government Council - Investment Council

References 

 
Politics of the Czech Republic

European governments